Taylor Smith may refer to:

 Taylor Smith (Australian footballer) (born 2000), Australian rules footballer with the Gold Coast Suns
 Taylor Smith (basketball) (born 1991), American basketball player
 Taylor Smith (golfer) (1967–2007), American golfer
 Taylor Smith (soccer) (born 1993), American soccer player